The Mid-Michigan Railroad  is a railroad owned by Genesee & Wyoming. It operates 39.8 miles of track in Michigan.

History
The company incorporated in 1987, for the purpose of acquiring railway lines from the CSX Corporation. The company was owned at inception by RailTex, a Texas-based holding company which owned many short line railroads. The Mid-Michigan bought two lines from CSX:Elmdale–Greenville and Paines–Elwell. In 1999 it sold the southernmost  of Elmdale line, Elmdale–Malta, back to CSX.

Routes

St. Louis Subdivision: Alma - Paines 

The only remaining line on the Mid-Michigan is the line from Alma to Paines. The line from Lowell to Greenville was sold back to Grand Rapids Eastern Railroad and soon after removed for a bike trail in 2009. Corn and soybeans are the main commodities hauled. The railroad interchanges with the Great Lakes Central Railroad at Alma and the Lake State Railway at Paines.

Traffic
The railroad's traffic comes mainly from grain products, such as corn and soybeans. The MMRR hauled around 5,100 carloads in 2008.

Notes

References

External links

Mid-Michigan Railroad official webpage - Genesee and Wyoming website

Railway companies established in 1987
RailAmerica
Michigan railroads
Companies based in Michigan
Muskegon, Michigan
Spin-offs of CSX Transportation
1987 establishments in Michigan